Tanjur (also Romanized as Ţanjūr; also known as Tanūr Dar) is a village in Shirvan Rural District, in the Central District of Borujerd County, Lorestan Province, Iran. At the 2006 census, its population was 1,156, in 283 families.

References 

Towns and villages in Borujerd County